Shapur I's victory relief at Naqsh-e Rostam is located 3 kilometers north of Persepolis. It is the most impressive of eight Sasanian rock carvings cut into the cliff beneath the tombs of their Achaemenid predecessors.

This carving depicts a famous scene in which the Roman Emperor, Valerian, is kneeling before Shapur I and asking for mercy. Shapur defeated Valerian at the Battle of Edessa, in which the entire Roman army was destroyed and Valerian became Shapour's prisoner. This was the first and only time a Roman emperor was taken prisoner. The Emperor Philip the Arab is depicting standing beside him. There is a Greek inscription of five lines underneath the horse, but it is damaged. It is believed that there were also two inscriptions, now destroyed, in Middle Persian and the  Parthian language.

References 

Sasanian inscriptions
3rd-century inscriptions
Naqsh-e Rustam
Shapur I
3rd-century documents
Rock reliefs in Iran
Philip the Arab